Matías Gabriel Ceballos (born May 20, 1984) is an Italian Argentinean footballer. In July 2006 he made his debut at Colón de Santa Fe in Argentina.

External links
  
 
 

Living people
1984 births
Club Atlético Colón footballers
Argentine footballers
Association football midfielders